Martin Beniston  was born in England in 1953 and holds three passports (Swiss, British, French). He has studied in the UK (Universities of East Anglia and Reading), France (Université Pierre et Marie Curie, Paris), and ETH-Zurich (“Habilitation” degree). After more than 40 years of academic life, he retired in the Summer of 2017, and is now an Honorary Professor at the University of Geneva.

After working in various institutes in several countries, including the Laboratoire de Météorologie Dynamique in Paris, the Max-Planck-Institute for Meteorology in Hamburg and ETH-Zurich, in the 1990s he was appointed one of the vice-chairs of the IPCC (Intergovernmental Panel on Climate Change, recipient of the 2007 Nobel Peace Prize) and was also lead and contributing author for several chapters of the IPCC reports. He was appointed full professor (1996-2006) and head of the Institute of Geography at the University of Fribourg and subsequently at the University of Geneva (2006-2017) where he headed the Institute for Environmental Sciences. He is featured in Reuter's list of the "Top 1000 most influential climate scientists" in its ranking that first appeared in 2021. 

His main research domains included regional climate modelling and the assessment of climate impacts, particularly in the Alpine region. Among his research accomplishments, he coordinated a major EU project from 2008-2014 (“ACQWA: Assessing climate impacts on the quantity and quality of water) with 37 partners in 10 countries and close to 100 participating scientists 
. He has served on research committees for the EU and national funding institutions in Switzerland, the UK, France, Spain, Norway, the Czech Republic and Singapore.

He has widely published in the international literature (see Google Scholar ) and was a member of the European Geosciences Union (EGU) and the American Geophysical Union (AGU). In the year 2000, he was elected to the Academia Europea, the European Academy of Science.

References 

Living people
Year of birth missing (living people)
Place of birth missing (living people)
Academic staff of the University of Geneva
Swiss climatologists